St Thomas's Church, Derby is a Church of England parish church in Derby, Derbyshire.

History

The church was conceived as a memorial to the late Archdeacon Thomas Hill. The foundation stone was laid on 25 March 1881 by Mrs. Alfred Oliver, daughter of Archdeacon Hill. The architect was Joseph Peacock of Bloomsbury Square, London. Construction proceeded quickly, with the consecration taking place on 22 December 1881.

In 1996 the four parishes of St James’, Derby, St Augustine's, Derby and St Chad's, Derby were united as the new parish of Walbrook Epiphany.

Incumbents
Albert James Maxwell 1904 - 1907 (afterwards Rector of St John the Baptist's Church, Collingham)

Organ
An organ was installed in 1881 by Brindley & Foster. A specification of the organ can be found on the National Pipe Organ Register.

Organists
Mr. Hardy 1883 - ????
J.C. Mumby ca. 1885
T. Herbert Bennett ???? - 1896 (afterwards organist of St Chad's Church, Derby)
Fred Corney 1896 - 1935
Eric Barringer 1935 - ????

See also
Listed buildings in Derby (Arboretum Ward)

References

Derby
Churches completed in 1881
Churches in Derby